Oki, Ōki, Ooki or Ohki (written: 大木 lit. "big tree") is a Japanese surname. Notable people with the surname include:

, Japanese comedian
, Japanese engineer
, Japanese statesman
, South Korean professional wrestler
, Japanese composer
, Japanese singer
, Japanese footballer
, Japanese sprinter
, Japanese footballer
, Japanese statesman
, Japanese footballer and manager
, Japanese voice actor
, Japanese AV actor and singer

Fictional characters:
, a character in the manga series Battle Royale
, a character in the manga series Kodomo no Omocha

Oki (written: 沖 lit. "open sea") is also a separate Japanese surname. Notable people with the surname include:

, Japanese jazz musician
, Japanese voice actress
, Japanese businessman
, Japanese actor and singer
, Japanese cyclist

Japanese-language surnames